Tadashi Nakayama may refer to:
 Tadashi Nakayama (artist), b. 1927
 Tadashi Nakayama (mathematician), 1912–1964